Mifta Uddin Chowdhury Rumi A politician and former justice of Sunamganj District of Sylhet Division of Bangladesh. He was the BNP's MP from Sunamganj-2 (Derai-Shala) seat in the sixth parliamentary elections of the 1996 year.

Birth and early life 
Justice Mifta Uddin Chowdhury Rumi was born in Dirai upazila of Sunamganj District.

Career 
Mifta Uddin Chowdhury Rumi is a former Justice of the Bangladesh High court.

Political life 
He is Politician in Sunamganj District. Former Vice-President of Sunamganj District BNP. He was the BNP's MP from Sunamganj-2 (Derai-Shala) seat in the sixth parliamentary elections of the 1996 year.

See also 
 Sunamganj-3
 February 1996 Bangladeshi general election

References

External links 
 List of 6th Parliament Members – Bangladesh parliament

People from Derai Upazila
Living people
Bangladesh Nationalist Party politicians
6th Jatiya Sangsad members
Year of birth missing (living people)